The Diocese of Zhytomyr was twice a Latin Church ecclesiastical territory or diocese of the Catholic Church in part of Ukraine, namely from 1321 to 1789 and again from 1925 to 1998.

History 
 Established in 1321 as Diocese of Zhytomyr / Žytomyr / Zytomierz
 Suppressed on 8 August 1798, its territory being reassigned to establish the Diocese of Lutsk and Zytomierz
 Restored on 28 October 1925 as Diocese of Žytomyr / Zhytomyr / Zytomierz, on territory returned from the above Diocese of Lutsk and Zytomierz.
 Suppressed again on 25 November 1998, to establish the Diocese of Kyïv–Žytomyr; however, its cathedral of the Holy Wisdom is the new bishopric's episcopal seat, while first-mentioned Kyiv (Ukraine's national capital Kyiv) only has a co-cathedral (and a former cathedral).

Episcopal ordinaries 
Suffragan Bishops of Žytomyr
very incomplete : most incumbents unavailable
 Auxiliary Bishop: Antanas Karosas (Antoni Karaś) (8 November 1906 – 7 April 1910), Titular Bishop of Dorylæum (8 November 1906 – 7 April 1910; later Bishop of Sejny (7 April 1910 – 28 October 1925), Bishop of Vilkaviškis (Lithuania) (5 April 1926 – death 7 July 1947)
 Jan Purwiński (16 January 1991 – 25 November 1998)
 Auxiliary Bishop: Stanislav Szyrokoradiuk, Friars Minor (O.F.M.) (26 November 1994 – 25 November 1998), Titular Bishop of Surista (26 November 1994 – 12 April 2014, next as Auxiliary Bishop of Kyïv–Žytomyr (Ukraine) (25 November 1998 – 12 April 2014), also Apostolic Administrator of Lutsk (Ukraine) (24 July 2012 – 12 April 2014); since 4 April 2014 Bishop of Kharkiv–Zaporizhia (Ukraine).

See also 
 List of Catholic dioceses in Ukraine

Sources and external links 
 GCatholic - data for all sections

Former Roman Catholic dioceses in Ex-Soviet Europe